Time Will Tell is the fifth studio album by Taiwanese Mandopop artist Hebe Tien from the girl group S.H.E. The CD album was released on September 25, 2020, followed by LP record that was released on 4 November 2020. This is the first studio album released through her new label Pourquoi Pas Music (PQPMusic) and partnership with her management A TUNE Music, after parting ways with her previous label HIM International Music.

At the 32nd Golden Melody Awards, Tien was awarded the Best Female Mandarin Singer for Time Will Tell, along with two other awards out of seven nominations.

Background and development 
In September 2018, Tien along with the other S.H.E members officially left HIM International Music after 17 years and founded her own management company, A TUNE Music (樂来樂好). On December 29, 2018, Tien released her first song after her departure from HIM, "Jasper Night" for the Chinese film Long Day's Journey into Night and will eventually release "Still Early" for the film Midnight Diner, her first song released in cooperation with PQPMusic in September 2019.

In April 30, 2019, Tien as the director of A TUNE Music held a press conference to announce her partnership with PQPMusic. In the press conference, there were five bricks and two crabs cleverly juxtaposed with the logos of the two companies hinting at Tien's fifth studio album and her second concert tour. It was then revealed that both projects already entered the preparatory stage.

Release 
On January 14, 2020 at 12 noon, Tien released her first single "Let It..." across digital music platforms without prior announcements and hinted at the release of her fifth album. Tien worked with photographer Li Hui for the visuals of the single. The music video was slated to be released on the 17th but in a press conference for a contact lens brand on the 18th, Tien said that there had been difficulties releasing the music video for the time being. She also revealed that the album will be released within the year and that she almost finished recording. The music video was eventually released on June 1, 2020 featuring Tien as a gynecologist meeting his college couple portrayed by Greg Han, 20 years after they graduated, and broke 1 million views in 30 hours.

On June 11, 2020, Tien released her second single "Anything Goes", the first song that was chosen for the new album. The music video which was shot around the rocky areas of national parks in Los Angeles, California was released on the 12th. On the 25th, it was announced that her second concert tour "One After Another Tour" to promote her upcoming album will kick off at Taipei Arena on September 25, 26 and 27. 33,000 tickets sold out in a minute when sales opened and another 11,000 tickets for the 28th which has been added also sold out within 30 seconds. She is the second artist to hold a concert in Taiwan during the COVID-19 pandemic following Eric Chou.

On July 3, 2020, Tien released her third single "One, after Another", and was accompanied by a music video released on the 10th. The music video was reported to cost 11 million NTD to produce. It received a nomination for Best Music Video at the 32nd Golden Melody Awards. On July 28, 2020, Tien followed up with her fourth single "You Should Know about It" and a music video with QR codes as the main element.

On August 17, 2020, Tien's fifth studio album Time Will Tell has been revealed. Dutch freelance photographer Astrid Verhoef was specially invited to create the main visuals for the album. The album visuals were taken in the American Southwest region. The reveal was followed by her fifth single "A Song For You" which was released on the 21st. Tien went to Taitung with the band Deca Joins to film the music video for the single which was then released on the 25th. On September 8, 2020, Tien released her sixth single "The Irony of Love". The music video featured Taiwanese actress Sandrine Pinna sitting in front of a vanity in a revolving room employing a one-shot long take video.

Following her fourth album Day by Day which was released 4 years prior, Tien released her fifth studio album Time Will Tell on September 25, 2020.

Track listing

Music videos

Awards and nominations

References
7. Website of Dutch Photographer Astrid Verhoef: Hebe Tien, www.astridverhoef.nl/hebe-tien

2020 albums
Hebe Tien albums